Waterbury is a city in Connecticut in the United States.

Waterbury may also refer to any one of the following:

Places in the United States
Waterbury, Florida, an unincorporated area in Manatee County, Florida
Waterbury, Nebraska
Waterbury, Vermont
Waterbury (village), Vermont, a village within the town of Waterbury, Vermont.
Waterbury, Wisconsin

People
Alexandra Waterbury, American ballet dancer and model
David How Waterbury, Jr. (1723-1801), Revolutionary War general and grandfather of John Tonnele
Nelson J. Waterbury (1819-1894), New York County D.A.
James Montaudevert Waterbury, Sr. (1851-1931), American businessman and industrialist
James Montaudevert Waterbury, Jr. (1876–1920), American polo player
Lawrence Waterbury (1877–1943), American polo player

Fiction
The Waterbury family, the subject of E. Nesbit's novel The Railway Children
A fictional place in the television series Slasher

Other
SS Waterbury, the original name of the 1919 United States Shipping Board cargo ship SS Empire Caribou
Waterbury Clock Company, the original name of Timex Group USA